Epimenia is a genus of cavibelonian solenogasters, a kind of shell-less, worm-like mollusks. 

During the development of species in this genus, the sclerites start out as solid tips, then a hollow stalk develops that is subsequently infilled.

Species 
 Epimenia allohaemata Salvini-Plawen, 1997
 Epimenia arabica Salvini-Plawen & Benayahu, 1991
 Epimenia australis (Thiele, 1897)
 Epimenia babai Salvini-Plawen, 1997
 Epimenia indica Salvini-Plawen, 1978
 Epimenia ohshimai Baba, 1940
Species brought into synonymy
 Epimenia verrucosa (Nierstrasz, 1902): synonym of Epimenia babai Salvini-Plawen, 1997
 Epimenia vixinsignis Salvini-Plawen, 1978: synonym of Epiherpia vixinsignis (Salvini-Plawen, 1978)

References

 Nierstrasz, H. 1908. The Solenogastres of Discovery-Expedition. Nation. Antarctic Exped. 1901-1904, Natur. Hist., 4:38-46

External links 
 
 Salvini-plawen, L. V. (1997). Systematic revision of the Epimeniidae (Mollusca: Solenogastres). Journal of Molluscan Studies. 63(2): 131-155

Solenogastres